Luke Petrasek (born August 17, 1995) is an American basketball player for the Anwil Włocławek of the Polish Basketball League. He played college basketball for Columbia.

Early life
Petrasek's grandfather Connie Simmons played for the New York Knicks from 1949 to 1954. Petrasek attended Northport High School, which he led to the 2013 Long Island Class AA Championship. He was a Newsday All-Long Island First Team honoree.

College career
Petrasek immediately entered the starting lineup for Columbia and named was named Ivy League rookie of the week after scoring 20 points and blocking three shots in an 82-59 win over Fairleigh Dickinson on December 21, 2013. As a junior at Columbia, Petrasek averaged 10.2 points and 4.5 rebounds per game. Shooting 11-for-14 from the floor, Petrasek scored a career-high 31 points to lead Columbia to a 79-75 win over Cornell on January 20, 2017. Petrasek averaged 15.1 points, 5.6 rebounds and 1.9 assists per game as a senior. He earned second-team All-Ivy League honors. For his college career, he averaged 9.0 points, 4.1 rebounds and 1.3 assists per game.

Professional career

Greensboro Swarm (2017–2019)
After not being chosen in the 2017 NBA Draft, he was invited by the Charlotte Hornets to participate in the NBA Summer League and made the training camp roster. Petrasek was signed by the Greensboro Swarm of the NBA G League in October. He averaged 6.1 points and 4.4 rebounds per game in his first season with the Swarm. Petrasek was invited to play for the Hornets in the 2018 Summer League.

Gießen 46ers (2019–2020)
On July 18, 2019, Petrasek signed with the Gießen 46ers. He averaged 10.9 points, 4.4 rebounds and 1.2 assists per game.

Nizhny Novgorod (2020–2021)
On July 13, 2020, he has signed with Nizhny Novgorod of the VTB United League.

Anwil Włocławek (2021–present)
On June 30, 2021, he has signed with Anwil Włocławek of the Polish Basketball League.

References

External links
 Columbia Lions bio

1995 births
Living people
American expatriate basketball people in Germany
American expatriate basketball people in Russia
American men's basketball players
Basketball players from New York (state)
BC Nizhny Novgorod players
Columbia Lions men's basketball players
Giessen 46ers players
Greensboro Swarm players
KK Włocławek players
People from East Northport, New York
Power forwards (basketball)
Sportspeople from Suffolk County, New York